Vallefiorita is a town and comune in the province of Catanzaro in the Calabria region of Italy.

Geography
The town is bordered by Amaroni, Cenadi, Centrache, Cortale, Girifalco, Olivadi, Palermiti and Squillace.

Notes and references

Cities and towns in Calabria